The Refreshment Pavilion is a historic refreshment stand at Houghton's Pond in the Milton portion of Blue Hills Reservation, a Massachusetts state park.  Built in 1920, it is one of a series of architect-designed structures built in the park by the Metropolitan District Commission.  It was listed on the National Register of Historic Places in 1980.

Description and history
The Refreshment Pavilion is located near the northern shore of Houghton's Pond, a body of water in the southwestern part of the Blue Hills Reservation.  It is set south of Hillside Street, the access road for the pond's beach area, which is located east of the pavilion.  It is a single-story rectangular stone structure with a gable roof.  Oculus windows are set in the gables, surrounded by louvered openings, and there are covered pergola-like porches extending from some of its sides supported by slatted supporting columns.

For many years they were largely undeveloped, and became a popular recreational destination by the late 19th century. The Metropolitan Parks Commission, created by the state to establish a network of parks and roadways around the Greater Boston area (and a predecessor to the MDC and today's Massachusetts Department of Conservation and Recreation, or DCR), formally acquired the reservation land in the early 1890s, but did no active development of amenities and infrastructure. By 1899, the need for roadways and other features was apparent, and the MDC hired the Boston firm Stickney and Austin to design structures for the reservation. Between 1899 and 1926 Stickney and Austin designed a number of structures, seven of which survive today. The Refreshment Pavilion at Houghton's Pond is one of these, exhibiting the use of high-quality materials and design sought by the firm and the MDC. It was built in 1920 on the site of the Ralph Houghton house which was built in 1690 and demolished in 1896 to make way for the development of the Blue Hills Reservation. It was added to the National Register of Historic Places as Refreshment  on September 25, 1980. It is still in use as a refreshment stand.

Gallery

See also
National Register of Historic Places listings in Milton, Massachusetts

References

Buildings and structures completed in 1920
Buildings and structures in Norfolk County, Massachusetts
Milton, Massachusetts
National Register of Historic Places in Milton, Massachusetts
Restaurants established in 1920
Restaurants in Massachusetts
Restaurants on the National Register of Historic Places in Massachusetts